Wolmark is a surname.  "Wolmark" is a Jewish term for people from Poland. Variants of the surname can be found in other countries of Eastern Europe, as well as Argentina and the United States.

People
 Alfred Wolmark (c.1877 – 1961), Polish painter and decorative artist
 Jenny Wolmark, British writer and professor
 Nina Wolmark, Belorussian writer and producer of animated series
 Zevi Wolmark (born 1962), American TV actor